, originally released in North America as Kicker, is a 1985 beat 'em up video game released by Konami. The game was commercially successful, becoming a chart hit in the arcades. It was ported to several early home computers and has also been featured in classics compilations Konami Arcade Classics in 1998 and Konami Classics Series: Arcade Hits in 2007, and was released for Microsoft's Game Room in 2010.

Plot
He then encounters the triad , also responsible for the assassination of his master , and is trapped within their . He attempts to escape and enact revenge with his new-found skills.

Gameplay
Controls consist of a four-position joystick and two buttons. The goal of each level ("step") is to defeat a set number of enemies, as indicated by an on-screen meter. The player can move left or right, jump between platforms/floors, and attack with various jumping/kicking strikes.

Enemies emerge from doorways to attack the player; some fight hand-to-hand, while others throw projectiles. Defeating a green-clad enemy causes a colored sphere to appear, which grants the player one of three power-up weapons for a few seconds if caught: a meteor hammer, the ability to throw fireballs, or a ball that orbits the player and damages any enemy it touches. Food items occasionally float across the screen and can be struck for bonus points.

The player can take three hits from enemies or their projectiles and continue fighting, but a fourth hit costs one life. Each step is divided into two parts; the second half includes a fight against a boss character, who requires five hits to defeat and may have a special attack technique. Once all enemies in either half of a step are defeated, the player earns bonus points based on the number of hits taken in that half and the damage meter is fully restored.

The game includes a total of five different step designs, which repeat in a cycle with increasing difficulty. Once all lives are lost, the game ends.

Reception and legacy 
In Japan, Game Machine listed Shao-lin's Road on their June 15, 1985 issue as being the twenty-second most-successful table arcade unit of the month. In Europe, Shao-lin's Road was marketed as a follow-up to Yie Ar Kung-Fu and became a commercial success in arcades. The Legend of Kage, released by Taito later the same year, was influenced by Shao-lin's Road.

Records
The current arcade world record is held by Estel Goffinet scoring 50,000,000 points on June 28 of 2014 in just under 32 hours of play. The score is listed in the Twin Galaxies database.

Adrian Rodriguez holds the official world record of 13,007,800 in the MAME platform on Twin Galaxies on 2018.

Notes

External links

Youtube Video: Shao-lin's Road Bruce Lee Edition - Gameplay

1985 video games
Amstrad CPC games
Arcade video games
Konami beat 'em ups
Commodore 64 games
Konami arcade games
ZX Spectrum games
Video games developed in Japan